Interstate 25 (I-25) is a part of the Interstate Highway System that runs from Las Cruces, New Mexico, to Buffalo, Wyoming. In Wyoming, the Interstate Highway runs  from the Colorado state line near Cheyenne north to its national terminus at I-90 near Buffalo. I-25 connects Wyoming's largest city and capital, Cheyenne, with its second largest city, Casper, and the smaller communities of Wheatland, Douglas, and Buffalo. The highway also connects those cities with Denver and Billings via I-90. I-25 runs concurrently with U.S. Route 87 (US 87) for almost its entire course in Wyoming. The highway also has extensive concurrencies with US 20 and US 26 along its east–west segment through the North Platte River valley. The Interstate has business loops through Cheyenne, Chugwater, Wheatland, Douglas, Glenrock, Casper, and Buffalo.

Route description

Cheyenne to Wheatland
I-25 enters Laramie County concurrent with US 87 from Weld County, Colorado, southwest of Cheyenne and briefly runs parallel to a BNSF Railway line. The four-lane Interstate has its first interchange, a diamond interchange, with Wyoming Highway 223 (WYO 223, Terry Ranch Road), and crosses over the Union Pacific Railroad's Speer Subdivision rail line and over the BNSF rail line. I-25 meets High Plains Road at a dumbbell interchange, then has a diverging diamond interchange with WYO 212 (College Drive), a junction that serves as the southern end of Interstate 25 Business (I-25 Bus.). The freeway has a cloverleaf interchange with I-80, crosses over the Union Pacific's Laramie Subdivision and US 30 (Lincolnway), and has a four-ramp partial cloverleaf interchange with US 30, which here is also part of I-80 Bus.

I-25 continues north along the western edge of the city of Cheyenne and along the eastern edge of Francis E. Warren Air Force Base, which is served by the next three interchanges. The highway has a five-ramp partial cloverleaf interchange with Missile Drive, crosses over a BNSF rail yard, and has a diamond interchange with Randall Road, which leads to Pershing Boulevard. I-25 reconnects with its business route at Central Avenue, where US 85 joins the Interstate. The freeway has a dumbbell interchange with Vandehei Street before leaving the city of Cheyenne and passing through the unincorporated area of Ranchettes. I-25 has an interchange with WYO 211 (Horse Creek Road) before US 85 splits to the northeast. There is no direct access from southbound I-25 to northbound US 85 at the latter interchange; southbound traffic uses the WYO 211 interchange to turn around to access northbound US 85.

I-25 continues through sparsely populated northern Laramie County, where the Interstate crosses Lodgepole Creek and has five interchanges with minor roads: Ridley Road, an unnamed road only marked as exit 25, Whitaker Road, Nimmo Road, and an unnamed road that serves the Little Bear Community. The Interstate enters Platte County at its interchange with Bear Creek Road. I-25's first population center north of Cheyenne is Chugwater, where the highway crosses over a BNSF rail line and Chugwater Creek, has an interchange with WYO 211 and WYO 313 in town, and has an interchange with WYO 321 (Ty Basin Road) north of town. Those two interchanges serve as the termini for Chugwater's I-25 Bus. The Interstate meets the western end of WYO 314 (Slater Road) west of Slater; has minor interchanges with Hunton Road, Antelope Road, and Bordeaux Road; and meets the eastern end of WYO 34.

Wheatland to Casper

I-25's next serves the town of Wheatland, the county seat of Platte County. Wheatland's I-25 Bus. splits off onto Mariposa Boulevard and provides access to WYO 310 and WYO 312. The Interstate and business route reconvene at the north end of town. I-25 has minor interchanges with Laramie River Road near its crossing of the Laramie River and with Johnson Road. The Interstate meets US 26 at a directional T interchange at Dwyer Junction, and the U.S. Route joins I-25 and US 87 heading north. I-25 has minor interchanges with El Rancho Road and an unnamed access road to Middle Bear around a junction with the southern end of WYO 319 (Cassa Road). The Interstate has an interchange with Wyoming Highway 319 Spur (WYO 319 Spur) in the town of Glendo, then parallels WYO 319 and the BNSF rail line northwest into Converse County to the west of the Glendo Reservoir, an impoundment of the North Platte River. I-25 crosses over the North Platte River and a BNSF rail line at Orin, where the Interstate has an interchange with and is joined by US 20; this interchange serves as the western terminus of US 18.

I-25, US 87, US 20, and US 26 head west to Douglas, the county seat of Converse County. I-25 Bus. and its companion business routes—US 87 Bus., US 20 Bus., and US 26 Bus.—split northwest from a trumpet interchange into the city while I-25 and the mainline U.S. Routes pass to the south of the city. I-25 crosses over the BNSF rail line and the North Platte River, then curves northwest to meet the business routes at a trumpet interchange on the west side of the city near the business routes' intersection with WYO 59, which leads north to Gillette. I-25 continues west through interchanges with the western end of WYO 96 (La Prele Road), Inez Road, the road south to Ayres Natural Bridge, Barber Road, and Bixby Road. US 87, US 20, and US 26 diverge from I-25 east of Glenrock. I-25 Bus. joins the U.S. Routes in heading northwest toward the town, then reconnects with I-25 via WYO 95 (Deer Creek Road) south of town. I-25 enters Natrona County and has interchanges with WYO 253 (Hat Six Road) and WYO 258 (Wyoming Boulevard), which serves the town of Evansville to the north.

Casper to Buffalo

I-25 briefly parallels US 87, US 20, and US 26 (Yellowstone Highway) and enters the city of Casper at a complex junction—the complexity is explained in the description for I-25 Bus.—where the Interstate crosses over Yellowstone Highway, the three U.S. Routes join I-25, I-25 Bus. splits from the Interstate to serve downtown Casper, and US 87 Bus., US 20 Bus., and US 26 Bus. split from the mainline U.S. Routes on Yellowstone Avenue. I-25, US 87, US 20, and US 26 cross over the BNSF rail line and are paralleled by a pair of frontage roads, F Street to the north and E Street to the south. There are several slip ramps between I-25 and the frontage roads serving the three streets that connect the portion of Casper north of the BNSF rail line to downtown Casper. The first street, which is Bryan Stock Trail north of the Interstate and Beverly Street to the south, is part of the complex junction between the mainline Interstate and U.S. Routes and their business routes. The second street is McKinley Street, and the third street is Center Street and carries the northmost portion of I-25 Bus. and US 87 Bus. E Street begins from an exit ramp to Center Street as I-25 and F Street cross the North Platte River. West of the river, the freeway has a diamond interchange with WYO 220 (Poplar Street), then curves north and has a diamond interchange with US 20 and US 26, which split west toward Shoshoni and Casper–Natrona County International Airport, and the access road to the Casper Events Center.

I-25 leaves the city of Casper and has an interchange with WYO 254 (Wardwell Road) next to unincorporated Hartrandt and the town of Bar Nunn. The Interstate has an interchange with Ormsby Road in the Homa Hills area on the northern edge of the Casper populated area. I-25 has minor interchanges with Ranch Road and an unnamed road marketed as exit 223, then connects with the south end of WYO 387, which serves Midwest to the east, before entering Johnson County. The freeway has interchanges with Tisdale Mountain Road and Powder River Road just north of the highway's crossing of the South Fork of the Powder River. I-25 meets the southern end of WYO 196 (TTT Road) and parallels the state highway to Kaycee, where the highway crosses the Middle Fork of the Powder River and has an interchange with WYO 191. North of Kaycee, I-25 crosses the North Fork of the Powder River and has minor interchanges with Reno Road, Middle Fork Road, and Trabing Road and a crossings of two branches of Crazy Woman Creek near the Middle Fork interchange. The final I-25 Bus. and its companion, US 87 Bus., split off to the south of the town of Buffalo, the county seat of Johnson County. East of the town, I-25 has an interchange with US 16, which also carries I-90 Bus. The Interstate reaches its northern terminus at a directional T interchange with I-90. US 87 continues north along westbound I-90 toward Sheridan and Billings; I-90 also heads east toward Gillette. Buffalo's I-25 Bus. and US 87 Bus. have their northern terminuses at a partial interchange just west of the I-25/I-90 junction.

History

Construction on I-25 began with a section near Cheyenne in 1958. The final section of the freeway, spanning  between Casper and Kaycee, was opened on February 2, 1982.

Exit list

Related routes

I-25 in Wyoming currently has no auxiliary Interstates but has six business loops and one business spur. Its business loops are located in Cheyenne, Chugwater, Wheatland, Douglas, Glenrock, and Casper. The business spur is located in Buffalo.

References

External links

25
 Wyoming
Transportation in Laramie County, Wyoming
Transportation in Platte County, Wyoming
Transportation in Converse County, Wyoming
Transportation in Natrona County, Wyoming
Transportation in Johnson County, Wyoming